John Parricida or John the Parricide, also called John of Swabia (Johann von Schwaben), (ca. 1290 – 13 December 1312/13) was the son of the Habsburg duke Rudolf II of Austria and Agnes, daughter of King Ottokar II of Bohemia. By killing his uncle, King Albert I of Germany, he foiled the first attempt of the Habsburg dynasty to install a hereditary monarchy in the Holy Roman Empire.

Life
John was born shortly before or after the death of his father Rudolf II, the younger son of King Rudolf I of Germany. His mother was Agnes, daughter of King Ottokar II of Bohemia. He passed his early days at the Bohemian court and the town of Brugg in the Swabian home territory of the Habsburgs, where he is mentioned as titular duke in a 1294 deed. 

As John's father had been forced to waive his right to the Habsburg duchies of Austria and Styria in favour of his elder brother Albert I according to the 1283 Treaty of Rheinfelden, he felt deprived of his inheritance. When he came of age, he demanded a portion of the family estates from his uncle, who had finally prevailed in the election as King of the Romans against Adolph of Nassau in 1298. His wishes, however, were not gratified nor did he receive any of the compensations in the Swabian territories of Further Austria, awarded to his father by the Rheinfelden Treaty. In 1306, King Albert even placed his son, Duke Rudolf III, on the Bohemian throne, denying his nephew's right of inheritance. Thereupon John, mocked as "Duke Lackland" (Hertzog Anlant), with several companions of Swabian nobility formed a plan to murder the king.

A Habsburg family banquet in Winterthur, held by Albert on the evening of 30 April 1308, gave rise to a scandal, when the invitee John rejected a floral wreath offered by his uncle, exclaiming that he would not be fobbed off with flowers. The next day, King Albert on his way home became separated from his attendants when crossing the Reuss River near Windisch, and was at once attacked by John and his conspirators. John rode toward his uncle and split his skull without a word. He escaped the vengeance of Albert's sons, and from that point his fate remained unknown. In the same year, the prince-electors chose the Luxembourg count Henry VII as Albert's successor, who placed John under the imperial ban (Reichsacht). John allegedly fled to Italy and found refuge in a Pisa monastery, where, in 1313, he is said to have been visited by Emperor Henry VII. After the defeat of Albert's son Frederick the Fair at the 1322 Battle of Mühldorf, the Habsburg dynasty was not able to regain the German crown until the election of Albert II in 1438.

Fictional character
The character of John is rendered by Friedrich Schiller in his 1804 drama William Tell: John on the run arrives at Tell's house begging for help and arguing that he had to take revenge on his enemy — like Tell on bailiff Albrecht Gessler. Tell rejects the comparison but directs him to Italy, advising him to seek papal absolution. 

John's fate was further perpetuated in the poem Der Graf von Thal (1838) by Annette von Droste-Hülshoff and by the Austrian writer Johann Nepomuk Vogl, whose ballad Der Mönch zu Pisa was set to music by Carl Loewe (Op. 114) in 1846. Historical dramas were written by August Gottlieb Meißner (Johann von Schwaben, 1770) and Julius Grosse (Johann von Schwaben, 1870).

Notes

References

1290 births
1310s deaths
14th-century House of Habsburg
Austrian assassins
Regicides
Sons of monarchs